Daviesia laxiflora is a species of flowering plant in the family Fabaceae and is endemic to eastern Victoria, Australia. It is a large shrub or small tree with drooping branches, linear to narrow elliptic phyllodes and long racemes of mostly bright yellow flowers.

Description

Taxonomy and naming
This daviesia was first formally described in 1957 by James Hamlyn Willis who gave it the name Daviesia corymbosa var. laxiflora in The Victorian Naturalist from specimens he collected in 1940. In 1991, Michael Crisp raised the variety to species status as Daviesia laxiflora in Australian Systematic Botany. The specific epithet (laxiflora) means "loose-flowered".

Distribution and habitat

References

laxiflora
Flora of Victoria (Australia)
Plants described in 1957
Taxa named by James Hamlyn Willis